Meezan Bank is the first Islamic bank in Pakistan and commenced operations in 2002, after being issued the first-ever Islamic commercial banking licence by the State Bank of Pakistan. The Bank is headquartered at Meezan House in Karachi, Pakistan. It has a network of over 890 branches. 

The bank has a market share of 35% in the Islamic banking industry of the country.

History
The bank started as an Islamic investment bank in 1997 and was then known as Al-Meezan Investment Bank.

In 2002, Meezan Bank acquired Pakistan operations of Société Générale.

In 2014, Meezan Bank signed an agreement with HSBC Bank Middle East to acquire HSBC's Pakistan operations consisting of 10 branches.

In 2015, Meezan Bank acquired Pakistan operations of HSBC Oman consisting of a single branch.

Shareholding structure 
Noor Financial Investment Company (35.25 percent)
Pak Kuwait Investment Company (30.00 percent)
Islamic Development Bank (9.32 percent)

References

Bibliography

External links

 Official website of Meezan Bank

Pakistani companies established in 1997
Banks established in 1997
Companies based in Karachi
Companies listed on the Pakistan Stock Exchange
Islamic banks of Pakistan
Pakistani subsidiaries of foreign companies
Kuwait–Pakistan relations